Aleksandr Ivanovich Konovalov (17 September 1875, Moscow – 28 January 1949, Paris, France; Sainte-Geneviève-des-Bois Cemetery) was a Russian Kadet politician and entrepreneur.  One of Russia's biggest textile manufacturers, he became a leader of the liberal, business-oriented Progressist Party and was a member of the Progressive Bloc in the Fourth Duma.

Biography
During World War I he was vice president of Alexander Guchkov's Military-Industrial Committee, and after the February Revolution he became Minister of Trade and Industry in the Provisional Government. He was an active member of the irregular freemasonic lodge, the Grand Orient of Russia’s Peoples. After the October Revolution he emigrated to France, where he was a leader of leftist Russian émigrés; at the start of World War II he moved to the United States.

References

External links 
 Encyclopædia Britannica
 Biographies with pictures (Russian)
 Michael T. Florinsky (ed.), McGraw-Hill Encyclopedia of Russia and the Soviet Union (1961), p. 284.

1875 births
1948 deaths
Politicians from Moscow
People from Moskovsky Uyezd
Old Believers
Progressive Party (Russia) politicians
Russian Constitutional Democratic Party members
Ministers of the Russian Provisional Government
Members of the 4th State Duma of the Russian Empire
Russian Constituent Assembly members
White Russian emigrants to France
White Russian emigrants to the United States
Emigrants from the Russian Empire to France
Members of the Grand Orient of Russia's Peoples